Jim Jones (1931–1978) was the cult leader of the Peoples Temple responsible for the collective suicide at Jonestown, Guyana.

Jim Jones may also refer to:

Sports
Jim Jones (1900s outfielder) (1876–1953), Major League Baseball outfielder
Jim Jones (1940s outfielder), American baseball outfielder in the 1940s
Jim Jones (footballer) (1918–2002), Australian rules footballer for Carlton
Jim Jones (ice hockey) (born 1949),  Canadian National Hockey League player
Jim Jones (American football, born 1920) (1920–1989), American football player
Jim Jones (American football, born 1935) (1935–1982), American football player
Jim Jones (offensive guard) (born 1978), American football player
Jim Jones (cricketer) (1931–1998), New Zealand cricketer

Music
Jim Jones (musician), British singer and guitarist with Thee Hypnotics and Jim Jones Revue
Jim Jones (guitarist) (1950–2008), American guitarist with the band Pere Ubu
Jim Jones (rapper) (born 1976), American rapper from Harlem
"Jim Jones at Botany Bay", traditional Australian folk ballad

Politics and government
 Jim Jones (Idaho politician) (1922–2012), American politician from Idaho
Jim Jones (judge) (born 1942), chief justice of the Idaho Supreme Court and former Attorney General of Idaho
Jim Jones (Canadian politician) (born 1943), Canadian politician

Other
Stephen Huntley Watt (born 1984), an American computer scientist and former hacker whose aliases included "JimJones"

See also
James Jones (disambiguation)
Jimmy Jones (disambiguation)
Jimmie Jones (disambiguation)